The European Bread Museum, in Ebergötzen in South Lower Saxony, Germany, is a rurally located museum dedicated to the historical development of breadmaking  and related subjects in Europe.  Through displays and demonstrations, the museum shows the history of grain farming in Europe, processing of grain, milling, baking of bread, bread in art, and other subjects.  Gardens, functioning re-constructed ovens (beginning with the neolithic), a windmill and a watermill, bread wagons, farm machinery, documents, and tools and equipment for preparing bread are among the objects to be seen.

See also

 Bread in Europe#Germany
 List of food and beverage museums

External links
 Museum's home-page (in German)

Museums in Lower Saxony
Food museums in Germany